This is a list of Administrators of Dadra and Nagar Haveli and Daman and Diu a union territory of India. The union territory of Dadra and Nagar Haveli and Daman and Diu was created following the merger of the union territories of Dadra and Nagar Haveli and Daman and Diu on 26 January 2020.

Administrators of Dadra and Nagar Haveli and Daman and Diu

See also
 Dadra and Nagar Haveli and Daman and Diu
 List of administrators of Dadra and Nagar Haveli
 List of administrators of Daman and Diu
 Governors in India

References

Sources
 http://www.worldstatesmen.org/India_states.html

Government of Dadra and Nagar Haveli and Daman and Diu
Lists of governors of Indian states
Indian government officials